Michael Reimann (born 3 February 1952 in Magdeburg) is a former West German slalom canoeist who competed in the 1970s.

He won a gold medal in the C-2 team event at the 1973 ICF Canoe Slalom World Championships in Muotathal.

Reimann also finished seventh in the C-2 event at the 1972 Summer Olympics in Munich.

References

External links

1952 births
Sportspeople from Magdeburg
Canoeists at the 1972 Summer Olympics
German male canoeists
Living people
Olympic canoeists of West Germany
Medalists at the ICF Canoe Slalom World Championships